Sedeh Lenjan (also Romanized as Sedeh Lenjān and Sedeh Lanjān; also known simply as Sedeh) is a city in the Central District of Lenjan County, Isfahan Province, Iran. At the 2006 census, its population was 17,335, in 4,167 families.

References

Populated places in Lenjan County

Cities in Isfahan Province